Jorge Soto (2 March 1945 – 26 October 2011) was an Argentine professional golfer.

Soto was born in Merlo, Buenos Aires and turned professional in 1963.

Soto won the Argentine Order of Merit in 1982 and 1983. He won the Argentine Open in 1982 and was runner up in 1972. He also won The Argentine PGA Championship in 1984 and 1989, having finished second in 1968 and 1977.

Soto represented Argentina on four occasions in the World Cup, with a best finish of 5th place in partnership with Juan Carlos Cabrera in the 1975 edition in Thailand.

Professional wins

Argentine wins (30)
1966 Charles of the Ritz Grand Prix
1975 North Open, Chaco Open, Jujuy Open, Fultom Grand Prix
1976 San Martin Grand Prix
1977 Olavarria Grand Prix
1978 Tortugas Grand Prix
1979 Chaco Open
1980 Tortugas Grand Prix
1981 Ituzaingo Grand Prix
1982 Argentine Open, Rio Cuarto Open, Chaco Open, Jockey Club San Isidro Grand Prix
1983 South Open, Acantilados Grand Prix, Rio Cuarto Open, Abierto del Litoral (tie with Adan Sowa), Jockey Club Rosario Open
1984 Argentine PGA Championship, Los Lagartos Grand Prix, Hindu Club Grand Prix
1986 Ituzaingo Grand Prix
1989 Center Open, Argentine PGA Championship
1990 Highland Park Grand Prix
1992 Pinamar Open
1993 South Open
1994 Jose Jurado Grand Prix

Other wins (1)
1988 Prince of Wales Open (Chile)

Argentine senior wins (3)
1997 Osvaldo Manzini Senior Grand Prix, Pilar Senior Open, Boca Raton Senior Grand Prix

Team appearances
World Cup (representing Argentina): 1975, 1979, 1980, 1988

References

Argentine male golfers
Sportspeople from Buenos Aires Province
1945 births
2011 deaths